K. Kunhammad is an Indian politician who served as a member of 13th Kerala Legislative Assembly representing the Communist Party of India (Marxist) from Perambra. He was previously elected to Kerala Legislative Assembly in 2006 from the same constituency.

Political life
He was the District President and State Committee Member of D.Y.F.I. He served as the president of Perambra Grama Panchayat from 1988 to 2001.

Personal life
He was born on 1 May 1949 at Nochat. He is the son of Ibrayi and Pathu. He is a retired teacher. He is married to Fathima and has one daughter and three sons.

References 

Members of the Kerala Legislative Assembly
Communist Party of India (Marxist) politicians from Kerala
Living people
1949 births